Sergei Anatolyevich Zorya (born 6 September 1972) is a former Russian football player.

External links
 

1972 births
People from Dimitrovgrad, Russia
Living people
Soviet footballers
FC Zenit Saint Petersburg players
Russian footballers
Russian Premier League players
FC Torpedo Moscow players
FC Torpedo-2 players
FC Asmaral Moscow players
Association football midfielders
Sportspeople from Ulyanovsk Oblast